Kışlak is a small town in Hatay Province, Turkey

Geography 
The population was 1114 as of 2012.

History 

There are traces of human habitation dated upper Palaeolithic around Kışlak.  Akkadian Empire, Yamhad Kingdom, Hittite Empire, Egyptian Kingdom, Achaemenid Empire,  Ptolemaic dynasty of Egypt, Roman Empire, Byzantine Empire, Umayyad Caliphate, Seljuk Turks, Crusades, Egyptian Mamluks and Ottoman Turks ruled the area around Kışlak. The first documented  settlement in Kışlak dates back to 300 years ago during Ottoman rule. Between 1918 and 1938 the town was under French Mandate. In 1939 together with the rest of Hatay Republic it merged to Turkey. In 1998 Kışlak was declared a seat of township.

Economy 
Cereal, tobacco and olive are the  main agricultural products of Kışlak. There is also an olive oil press in the town.  Nuts, figs and pomegranate are also produced.

References 

Towns in Turkey
Populated places in Hatay Province
Yayladağ District